The 1989 Australian Touring Car season was the 30th year of touring car racing in Australia since the first runnings of the Australian Touring Car Championship and the fore-runner of the present day Bathurst 1000, the Armstrong 500.

There were 12 touring car race meetings held during 1990; an eight-round series, the 1989 Australian Touring Car Championship (ATCC); a support programme event at the 1989 Australian Grand Prix and three long-distance races, nicknamed 'enduros'.

Results and standings

Race calendar
The 1989 Australian touring car season consisted of 12 events.

Australian Touring Car Championship

Australian Manufacturers' Championship

Pepsi 300

Sandown 500

Tooheys 1000

Yokohama Cup Group A Races 
This meeting was a support event of the 1989 Australian Grand Prix. This was the first time that the Group A cars ran two races at the Australian Grand Prix meeting, one on the Saturday afternoon and the second on the Sunday morning.

References

Linked articles contain additional references.

Australian Touring Car Championship
Touring Cars